Umbrawarra Gorge Nature Park is a protected area in the Northern Territory.  It is located 145 km south of Darwin and 115 km west of Katherine.

References

External links
Umbrawarra Gorge Nature Park

Nature parks of the Northern Territory